Brazilian submarine Humaitá or Humaytá may refer to one of the following submarines of the Brazilian Navy:

  (sometimes also spelled as Humaitá), an Italian  launched at La Spezia in 1927; completed and commissioned into the Brazilian Navy in 1929; decommissioned in 1950.
 , the former American  USS Muskallunge (SS-262) launched at Groton, Connecticut, in 1942; acquired by the Brazilian Navy in 1957; returned to the United States Navy in 1968 and subsequently sunk as a target.
 , a British  ordered from Vickers in 1970 and launched at Barrow in 1971; commissioned into the Brazilian Navy in 1973; decommissioned in 1996.

 , a Scorpène-class submarine launched in 2020, currently in sea trials.

Brazilian Navy ship names